The 1973–74 season was Port Vale's 62nd season of football in the Football League, and their fourth successive season (tenth overall) in the Third Division. They finished in twentieth spot, though were seven points clear of relegation. Manager Gordon Lee left the club in January, and was replaced by club legend Roy Sproson.

Overview

Third Division
The pre-season saw Sammy Morgan sold to Aston Villa for £22,222 (plus top-up fees). Gordon Lee drafted in tall young players David Harris and John Ridley from the youth set-up, as well as versatile Keith Chadwick from Crewe Alexandra. The club also erected a 2.5 feet high steel fence around the Bycars End to help combat hooliganism.

The season opened with four games unbeaten, though Tommy McLaren soon damaged his ligaments, and the team suffered in his absence. On 1 October, Vale beat Wrexham 1–0 in an 'ugly' game that saw five players booked and Colin Tartt and opposition player Arfon Griffiths separated by police following a scrap in the tunnel. Later in the month Roy Cross badly injured his knee, and would later have to leave the professional game due to the injury. Vale slipped down the league, and by Christmas they were sixth from bottom, with only John Woodward in good form. Lee then took out striker Keith Leonard on loan from Aston Villa, and bought left-back Neil Griffiths from Chester for a £5,000 fee. He also changed the formation from 4–4–2 to 4–3–3, hoping to give Brian Horton more room in the centre of the park. After an upturn in form in the new year, Bill Summerscales broke his neck, and Lee departed for the management position at Blackburn Rovers. Lee had been seen to have done an excellent job with little money. In his place club legend Roy Sproson was appointed as caretaker manager, who advocated an 'entertaining' style of play as opposed to battling for every point. Winning his first match 1–0 at Shrewsbury Town, he cracked his head on the concrete trainer's box after leaping up to celebrate McLaren's goal. On 17 February, 8,505 turned up at Vale Park to witness a 3–1 win over high-flying Bristol Rovers in an experimental Sunday game. Later Leonard returned to Villa Park at the end of his loan deal, and £5,000 was not enough to tempt Villa to part with his services permanently. From mid-March Vale went eleven games without a win, and on 25 March they could have ended this run, but 'a shocking mistake' from Alan Boswell handed Walsall an equalizer as he palmed a header into his own net. The team continued to rack up yellow cards, and following a warning from The Football Association, Sproson arranged for local referee Roy Capey to lecture the players on sportsmanship. In the middle of April, Sproson was given the management job on a permanent basis, despite his team falling to fifth from bottom. Sproson stated that he was 'calculated' and 'controlled', compared to Lee who 'fizzes like a bottle of pop'. By the time they broke their poor run with a 2–1 home win over managerless Charlton Athletic, other results had already ensured their safety from the drop.

They finished in twentieth position with 42 points, though this meant they were seven points clear of relegated Cambridge United in 21st place.

Finances
On the financial side, an average home attendance of under 4,000 failed to prevent a profit of £17,831. This profit came from the early sale of Morgan, and donations of £16,443 from the Sportsmen's Association and the Development Fund. The club's total debt stood at £121,647, as Chairman Singer warned of more player sales to balance the books. Two players leaving for free at the end of the season were Bobby Gough (Southport) and Alan Boswell (Oswestry Town) – Boswell was described as 'capable of brilliant saves and conceding soft goals'.

Cup competitions
In the FA Cup, Vale won away at Stockport County 1–0, before advancing past Northern Premier League Scarborough in the Second Round. After a 1–1 draw in Burslem with Second Division Luton Town, they lost the replay at Kenilworth Road 4–2.

In the League Cup, Vale exited at the first stage with a 2–0 defeat at Edgeley Park to Fourth Division Stockport County.

League table

Results
Port Vale's score comes first

Football League Third Division

Results by matchday

Matches

FA Cup

League Cup

Player statistics

Appearances

Top scorers

Transfers

Transfers in

Transfers out

Loans out

References
Specific

General

Port Vale F.C. seasons
Port Vale